"Love Removal Machine" is a song recorded by the British rock band the Cult. It was the first single to be released from the group's 1987 album Electric. First recorded during a radio session, it had a different arrangement when it was recorded for the band's third album, Peace. When that album was scrapped, it was re-recorded for the replacement album, Electric. An extended remix was also created and released on a 12" single. The song's main riff has been compared to that of "Start Me Up" by The Rolling Stones. "Love Removal Machine" was named the 74th best hard rock song of all time by VH1.

Track listing 
Double Vinyl 7"
 "Love Removal Machine"
 "Wolf Child's Blues"
 "Conquistador"
 "Groove Co"

Vinyl 7"
 "Love Removal Machine"
 "Wolf Child's Blues"

Vinyl 12"
 "Love Removal Machine (Extended Version)"
 "Love Removal Machine"
 "Wolf Child's Blues"
 "Conquistador"
 "Groove Co"

Cassette
 Love Removal Machine
 Wolf Child's Blues
 Conquistador
 Groove Co
 Love Removal Machine (Extended Version)

Charts

Weekly charts

Certifications

References 

1986 songs
1987 singles
The Cult songs
Song recordings produced by Rick Rubin
Songs written by Ian Astbury
Songs written by Billy Duffy
Beggars Banquet Records singles